Marsh Mokhtari is a British born, US based TV host, actor and producer.

Career 
His TV credits include hosting Extreme Chef on Food Network, host of Perilous Journeys on National Geographic Channel, and several soap-opera appearances as Chris Boothe in 2006 on Passions and Carson MacDonald in 2007 on The Young and The Restless.

Mokhtari and his wife, Jan, started Golden State Distillery which produces Gray Whale Gin. A percentage of the sales of Gray Whale Gin goes toward environmental causes.

Personal life 
Mokhtari and his wife have two daughters.

References 

American television hosts
British male actors
Living people
Year of birth missing (living people)